Coed y Crychydd is a Site of Special Scientific Interest in Ceredigion,  west Wales. It is a moderately steep, north facing wood, featuring mainly ancient semi-natural woodland overlooking the Ystwyth Valley, managed by the Woodland Trust since 1980. The site support a variety of birds, including red kite, buzzard, raven and heron.

See also
List of Sites of Special Scientific Interest in Ceredigion

References

Sites of Special Scientific Interest in Ceredigion